Grigson is a surname. Notable people with the surname include:

Christopher Grigson (1926–2001), British naval architect and electronics engineer credited with inventing scanning electron diffraction
Geoffrey Grigson (1905–1985), British writer
Jane Grigson (1928–1990), English cookery writer
John Grigson DFC and two bars DSO (1893–1943), British pilot in the Royal Air Force
Lionel Grigson (1942–1994), British jazz pianist, cornettist and teacher
Mary Grigson (born 1971), Australian cyclist
Sophie Grigson (born 1959), English cookery writer and celebrity chef
Wilfrid Grigson CSI (1896–1948), British soldier and civil servant

See also
Jane Grigson Award, award issued by the International Association of Culinary Professionals (IACP)